Amblyseius siddiqui is a species of mite in the family Phytoseiidae.

References

siddiqui
Articles created by Qbugbot
Animals described in 1969